Magne Johnsen Rognved (27 June 1858 - 28 October 1933) was a Norwegian politician for the Moderate Liberal Party and the Liberal Party.

He was elected to the Norwegian Parliament in 1904, representing the constituency of Søndre Bergenhus Amt. He had served as a deputy representative during the term 1900–1903, and returned as a deputy in 1913–1915. He represented the Moderate Liberal Party in the first two terms.

Born in Haus, Rongved first had a career in the military before returning to his home island in 1909 to serve as police sergeant in Hammer. Besides this, he worked as a farmer. He was mayor of Haus for twelve years.

He married three times.

References

1858 births
1933 deaths
Members of the Storting
Moderate Liberal Party politicians
Liberal Party (Norway) politicians
Mayors of places in Hordaland